There Is Another Sun, released in the United States as Wall of Death, is a 1951 British drama film directed by Lewis Gilbert and starring Maxwell Reed, Laurence Harvey and Susan Shaw. It was produced by Ernest G. Roy. The film was shot at Walton Studios, with sets designed by the art director George Provis.

Cast

External links

1951 drama films
1951 films
Films directed by Lewis Gilbert
British drama films
Circus films
Films produced by Ernest G. Roy
British black-and-white films
1950s English-language films
1950s British films